Mehdat Abdul Salam Shabana (born in Afghanistan) was a member of the board of directors, during the mid-1990s, of the now defunct Konsojaya Trading Company, a terrorist front organization based in Kuala Lumpur, Malaysia. He owned half of the company's 6,000 shares.  Konsojaya was a shell company cofounded by Riduan Isamuddin, better known as "Hambali", in June 1994. As of January 2002, Shabana's whereabouts were still unknown.

Hambali, now in U.S. custody since 2003, was the leader of the southeast Asia terrorist group Jemaah Islamiyah, which later became associated with al-Qaeda, along with Abu Sayyaf in the Philippines. Hambali was also a close friend of the later al-Qaeda 9/11 mastermind, Khalid Shaikh Mohammed, also now in U.S. custody since 2003.  Mohammed in turn had become one of the original 22 FBI Most Wanted Terrorists, indicted for his role in the planning of the 1995 terrorist plot named Operation Bojinka, to bomb eleven U.S. airliners.  It was accidentally discovered and foiled in Manila, Philippines.  

The Bojinka bombs were in the process of being constructed by Mohammed's nephew, Ramzi Yousef, who was, by then, already wanted by the United States Department of Justice as one of the FBI's Ten Most Wanted Fugitives for his own earlier role in the 1993 World Trade Center bombing.

Another Afghan named Wali Khan Amin Shah was also one of the board of directors of the Konsojaya company. He owned the other half (3,000) of the company's 6,000 shares.  Another member was 30-year-old Hemeid H. Algamdi, of Jeddah, Saudi Arabia. The Yemeni man Amein Mohamed was the managing director of Konsojaya. 

Konsojaya stated in its incorporation papers that it was an "import/export" company that shipped palm oil to Afghanistan from Malaysia. The organization also dealt with the export of Sudanese honey. 

Konsojaya actually funneled money and material assistance to several regional militant Islamic plots. The organization also funneled money to an account owned by Omar Abu Omar, an employee of the International Relations and Information Centre, an organization run by Mohammed Jamal Khalifa, who is married to one of Osama bin Laden's sisters. The money was then be siphoned into an account under the name of "Adam Salih", an alias of Ramzi Yousef, who was at the time planning the Bojinka attack.

According to corporate records in Kuala Lumpur, Konsojaya no longer exists.

Rodolfo Mendoza, the former head of Philippine counter-terrorism who led the Bojinka investigation, said in a telephone interview in January 2002 that "Konsojaya was the nerve center not only for business but also for operational supervision [of the Bojinka plot]," and "was formed for the purpose of terrorist activity." "The most important was Wali Khan and the board of directors in Malaysia," he claimed, although "Ramzi Yousef was considered the most important," Mendoza said. "But it is the other way around."

Shabana's co-owner of Konsojaya, Wali Khan Amin Shah, in U.S. custody, went on trial in 1996, and is serving a life sentence.

As of January 2002, the other Konsojaya directors, including Shabana, were still at large.

References 

Jemaah Islamiyah
Year of birth missing
Prisoners and detainees of the United States federal government